Paulo Duarte is a Portuguese name, may refer to:

Paulo Duarte (archaeologist)  (1899–1984), Brazilian archaeologist and humanist
Paulo Duarte (footballer) (born 1969), Portuguese football defender and manager
Paulo Duarte (weightlifter) (born 1966), Portuguese weightlifter